A general election in the Philippines took place on May 9, 2016, for executive and legislative branches for all levels of government – national, provincial, and local, except for the barangay officials.

At the top of the ballot was the election for successors to Philippine President Benigno Aquino III and Vice President Jejomar Binay. There were also elections for:

 12 seats to the Senate;
 All 297 seats to the House of Representatives;
 All governors, vice governors, and 772 seats to provincial boards for 81 provinces;
 All mayors and vice mayors for 145 cities and for 1,489 municipalities;
 All members of the city councils and 11,924 seats on municipal councils; and
 Governor, vice governor and all 24 seats in the regional assembly of the Autonomous Region in Muslim Mindanao.

The regional elections for the Autonomous Region in Muslim Mindanao (ARMM) were scheduled for May 9, but that would have changed if the Bangsamoro political entity had replaced the ARMM. The ARMM elections pushed through, as scheduled.

Barangay and Sangguniang Kabataan elections were scheduled for October 2016, but were postponed to 2017. Congress postponed anew to barangay elections to May 2018.

Elections are organized, run, and adjudicated by the Commission on Elections better known as COMELEC with appeals under certain conditions allowed to the Regional Trial Courts, the Congress of the Philippines, or the Supreme Court of the Philippines sitting as the House of Representatives Electoral Tribunal, the Senate Electoral Tribunal, or the Presidential Electoral Tribunal.

Preparation

Commission on Elections membership
On May 4, 2015, President Benigno Aquino III appointed Presidential Commission on Good Government chairman Andres D. Bautista as chairman, and former Commission on Audit member Rowena Guanzon and Bangsamoro Business Club's board chairman Sherif Abas as commissioners. Bautista replaced Sixto Brillantes, while Guanzon and Abas replaced Lucenito Tagle and Elias Yusoph, who all retired in February 2015. All appointees will serve until February 2022.

A few days after the announcement, it was revealed that Abas is a nephew of Mohagher Iqbal, the chief negotiator of the Moro Islamic Liberation Front. Bautista said that Abas confirmed to him that he is Iqbal's nephew. Iqbal neither confirmed nor denied their relationship, calling it is a non-issue, and that there's nothing wrong if his nephew is appointed to a sensitive position.

Bautista was confirmed by the Commission on Appointments on September 21; meanwhile, Abas' confirmation was deferred because Senator Alan Peter Cayetano, who was not present when Bautista was confirmed, still had questions to ask Abas.

Voter registration

The commission started voter registration for the elections on May 6, 2014, to October 31, 2015. Under the law, the 9.6 million registered voters who do not have biometrics attached their registration will not be allowed to vote. Voter registration was suspended from October 12 to 16 to give way to the filing of candidacies. From October 17 to 31, the commission would extend its hours up to 9:00 p.m. to accommodate last minute registrants.

Voter registration was suspended in Puerto Princesa from April 20 to May 17, 2015, because of the 2015 mayoral recall election. The Voters' Registration Act prohibits voter registration during recall elections.

In June 2015, the commission denied reports that some voters' biometrics were lost, saying that they were only "degraded," and that "two thousand" voters would have to have their biometrics taken again. A month later, the commission opened booths in Metro Manila and Luzon to further registration. By that time, there were still 4.3 million voters with incomplete biometrics. The commission, seeing the successful turnout for registration at the malls, mulled holding the elections itself inside such malls. The commission's en banc had already approved "in principle" the mall voting process. Near the end of the month, the commission said that the number of voters without biometrics has decreased to 3.8 million.

By mid-August, the commission announced that they had purged 1.3 million records from the voters' list, including the deceased and voters who did not vote in the two immediate preceding elections, the 2013 general and 2013 barangay, and that voters without biometrics had fallen to 3.5 million. By August 30, the number of registered voters without biometrics data had fallen to 3.1 million; this was after a Social Weather Stations poll came out that as much as 9.7 million people still had not updated their biometrics yet and could be disenfranchised.

The Commission on Elections concluded the 17-month registration on October 31, and offered no extension, except for voters in Cagayan Valley which was devastated by Typhoon Lando, who were given until the next day to finish theirs. This was despite a petition to the Supreme Court by the Kabataan party-list to extend registration until January 8, 2016. Acting on the said petition, the Supreme Court issued a restraining order on the No Bio, No Boto mandatory voters biometrics campaign on December 1. It was later lifted after 16 days.

Counting machines

The 2016 general elections represented the largest electronic vote counting exercise in history as 92,509 vote counting machines were used to digitize voter-marked ballots and transmit the results to the Municipal Board of Canvassers.

In April 2015, the counting machines were leased from London-based Smartmatic after the Supreme Court of the Philippines invalidated the 300 million-peso contract between the Commission and the Smartmatic-TIM consortium for diagnostics and repair of  80,000 Precinct Count Optical Scan (PCOS) machines. The court said that the commission "failed to justify its resort to direct contracting."

Two months later, the Commission conducted a mock election where a "hybrid" system of manual counting and electronic transmission of results was tested out. Gus Lagman, former elections commissioner and a proponent of the hybrid system, pointed out the system's money-saving advantage and reliability, as opposed to full automation where the results can be manipulated. Meanwhile, the Commission overturned its self-imposed disqualification of Smartmatic from bidding on counting machines.

Senator Francis Escudero disapproved of the use of the hybrid system, saying "it brings back memories of the Hello Garci controversy". A few days later, the Commission informed the House of Representatives Committee on Suffrage and Electoral Reforms that they had decided not to use the hybrid system.

On a House of Representatives committee hearing held on late July, Elections chairman Andres Bautista told lawmakers that the Commission had decided to award Smartmatic-TIM a 1.7 billion peso contract to lease 23,000 OMR counting machines. Days later, the Commission declared the bidding for the refurbishing 80,000 machines as a failure, after two of the three bidders backed out, while the third was disqualified.

On August 13, the Commission agreed to lease 94,000 new OMR machines for 7.9 billion pesos, while the old machines used for 2010 and 2013 elections would be used for the 2019 elections.

By September, the Commission sought the transfer the site manufacturing the voting machines from China to Taiwan after it received intelligence reports from the military in July that China might sabotage the elections. Smartmatic, the manufacturer of the machines, acquiesced to the request. China, meanwhile, denied any plans of sabotaging the election, calling it "sheer fabrication." Smartmatic also won the contract worth P500 million for the electronic results transmission services of the voting machines.

On March 4, the Commission unanimously voted to disallow the issuance of voting receipt to voters, although onscreen verification was allowed, which would take an additional 15 seconds per voter.

The Commission eventually aborted mall voting and allowed the use of replacement ballots.

Results transmission

Election authorities, with the help of election services provider Smartmatic, created a Virtual private network (VPN) for the secure and reliable transmission of electoral data. To guarantee nationwide coverage, Smartmatic coordinated the main telecom companies in the Philippines.

This VPN was used to transmit the votes of over 44 million citizens from 36.805 polling centres. On election night, 4 hours after the polls closed, 80% vote counting machines had transmitted the election data, setting a new record for the Philippines.

Speed was one of the main reasons why Philippine authorities decided to automate elections. As an archipelago comprising over 7,000 islands, several of which lack a proper communications infrastructure, the transmission of results posed a challenge.

Bans

Gun Ban
The election gun ban was implemented starting from January 9, 2016, the official start of the 90-day election period. Francisco Pobe, regional director of COMELEC-13, also pointed out that the candidate should not bring bodyguards without gun ban exemption. Go Act, a pro-gun group formed by gun owners filed a petition before the Supreme Court to fully stop the implementation of the election gun ban.

Calendar 
On August 18, 2015, the commission released the calendar of activities for the May 9, 2016 national and local elections:

Following a request by the Centrist Democratic Party of the Philippines, the commission extended the period for holding political conventions to October 8, 2015. The commission did not extend the deadline of filing of candidacies, though.

The commission originally envisioned to release an "almost" final list of candidates on December 15, but postponed it to December 23. The commission did release a "final list" of vice presidential candidates on December 23, but Chairman Andres D. Bautista that disqualification cases on other positions led them to postpone the release to January 20, when the commission is expected to resolve all disqualification cases.

On January 21, the commission released an "initial" list of candidates for all positions. The list is subject to trimming as the disqualification cases on presidential, vice presidential and senatorial cases are to be resolved with finality.

Debates 
The Commission on Elections held three debates for presidential candidates—in Mindanao last February 2016, in Visayas last March 2016, and in Luzon last April 2016. A vice-presidential debate was also held in Metro Manila last April 10, 2016.

The commission identified the media entities who had covered the debates: GMA Network (E16: Eleksyon 2016) and Philippine Daily Inquirer (February 21), TV5 (Bilang Pilipino: Boto sa Pagbabago 2016 – English: As a Filipino: Vote for Change 2016) and Philippine Star (March 20), CNN Philippines (The Filipino Votes), Business Mirror, and Rappler (April 10), and ABS-CBN (Halalan 2016: Ipanalo ang Pamilyang Pilipino – English: Election 2016: Winning the Filipino Family) and Manila Bulletin (April 24).

The commission also encouraged non-governmental organizations to hold debates for Senate and local positions.

Candidates

Liberal Party

Partido Galing At Puso

Tapang At Malasakit

Talino At ProgresiBong Bukas

United Nationalist Alliance

PMM

Independents

Results
Rodrigo Duterte of PDP–Laban and Leni Robredo of the Liberal Party won the presidential and vice presidential elections, respectively. The Liberals also won a plurality of seats in both houses of Congress, but several of the Liberal Party members of the House of Representatives jumped ship to Duterte's PDP–Laban, allowing his party to create a supermajority coalition that put Pantaleon Alvarez into the Speakership. The Senate leadership was ultimately won by PDP–Laban's Koko Pimentel, with the Liberals ultimately comprising the minority bloc there. The election of Alvarez and Pimentel meant that PDP–Laban currently holds three of the four elected highest political offices, for the first time since 1986 when the Kilusang Bagong Lipunan held the offices of the presidency, vice presidency, parliamentary speaker and prime minister.

President

The winner of the presidential election succeeded President Benigno Aquino III, who was term limited. A separate election was held to determine the Vice Presidency; Jejomar Binay could have defended the vice presidency, but ran for president instead. Both elections were under the plurality voting system.

Vice president

Congress

Senate

12 seats of the Senate of the Philippines were up for election. The Philippines uses plurality-at-large voting to determine the winning candidates. With the country as one at-large "district", the twelve candidates with the highest number of votes joined the winners of the 2013 election in the Senate.

House of Representatives

All seats of the House of Representatives were up for election. There are two types of representatives: the district representatives, 80% of the members, were elected in the different legislative districts via the plurality system; each district elected one representative. The party-list representatives were elected via closed lists, with the parties having at least 2% of the vote winning at least one seat, and no party winning more than three seats. If the winning candidates don't surpass 20% of the members, other parties that got less than 2% of the national vote will get one seat each until all party-lists have been filled up.

District elections

Party-list election

Local

Local elections were held in all provinces, cities and municipalities. Executive posts were elected by the plurality system, while elections for the membership of the local legislatures were by plurality-at-large voting.

Each Sangguniang Panlalawigan (provincial board) has three ex officio members, while each Sangguniang Panlungsod (city council) and Sangguniang Bayan (municipal council) has two. The federation presidents each of Liga ng mga Barangay (barangay chairmen), Sangguniang Kabataan (youth council chairmen), and for Sangguniang Panlalawigan, the chapter presidents of the Sangguniang Bayan and Sangguniang Panlungsod (city and municipal councilors). The ex officio presiding officer of each local legislature is the chief executive's deputy, but that person only votes to break ties.

The federation presidents of the Liga ng mga Barangay and Sangguniang Kabataan were elected from the membership who won in the 2013 elections until December 2017, when they were replaced by appointees of the president, who voted among themselves who shall represent them. A barangay election, originally scheduled for October 2016, is postponed until 2018, to replace these appointees starting in December 2018.

Some legislatures have one reserved seat for indigenous peoples. These have three year terms, and selections are usually not synchronized with local and barangay elections. These are not included in the totals below.

See also
 Presidential transition of Rodrigo Duterte
Philippine barangay and Sangguniang Kabataan election, 2018, originally scheduled to be held in 2016, but was postponed twice to 2018.

References

 
2016 elections in the Philippines
General elections in the Philippines